Jozef Van Hove, better known as Pom, (b. Berchem, 16 November 1919 - 2 May 2014) was a Belgian comics writer and artist, mainly known for the humorous-satirical adventure comic strip Piet Pienter en Bert Bibber published in Gazet van Antwerpen. Pom was one of the best known Flemish comics authors of the 1950s. Between 1955 and 1995, 45 comic books were published of his newspaper comic strip.

Notes

External links
 Biography at Lambiek

1919 births
Belgian comics writers
Belgian comics artists
Belgian humorists
Belgian satirists
2014 deaths
People from Berchem